Lt.-Gen. Forbes Champagné (2 July 1754 – 23 October 1816) was a British Army officer who fought in the American Revolutionary War and served as Commander-in-Chief of the British Indian Army, 1807–11.

Background
Champagné was born into a family of French Huguenot exiles in Ireland, the son of the Very Rev. Arthur de Robillard Champagné, Dean of Clonmacnoise, and Marianne Hamon, daughter of Colonel Isaac Hamon. His paternal great-grandfather was Chevalier Josias de Robillard, Seigneur de Champagné de Torxé, Saintonge, who fled to Holland after the Edict of Fontainebleau in 1685, joining William of Orange's army. He married  Marie de la Rochefoucauld of the noble house of the same name. Their daughter Susanne married Henri de la Motte-Fouqué, baron de Saint-Seurin et de Tonnay-Boutonne, and was mother of Heinrich August de la Motte Fouqué. Their eldest son, Josias de Robillard (Forbes' grandfather), distinguished himself at a young age in service of Major-General Isaac de Monceau de la Melonière, who commanded a regiment of exiles in William's army during the Irish campaigns. He married Lady Jane Forbes, daughter of Arthur Forbes, 2nd Earl of Granard.

Forbes had three brothers: General Sir Josiah Champagné; Rev. Arthur Champagné, vicar of Castlelyons; and Rev. George Champagné, Canon of Windsor and Rector of Twickenham. He had six sisters, including Jane, who married the Earl of Uxbridge; Henrietta, wife of Sir Erasmus Dixon Borrowes, 6th Baronet; and Marianne, wife of Sir Charles des Voeux, 1st Baronet.

Military career
Champagné was commissioned into the 4th Regiment of Foot in 1773. He served in the Southern Colonies during the American Revolutionary War and took part in the Battle of Wetzell's Mill in 1781. By 1796 he had been appointed Commanding Officer of the 20th Regiment of Foot.

He was Commander-in-Chief, India from 1807 to 1811 during which time he was promoted to Lieutenant-General.

He also became Colonel of the 1st Battalion of the 95th Regiment of Foot.

He lived in Merton and died on 23 October 1816.

References

External links
Urwin, Gregory J. W. (18 October 2016). Journal of the American Revolution: "With Cornwallis to the Dan: Deconstructing the 'Forbes Champagné Letter'

1754 births
1816 deaths
British Army lieutenant generals
British Commanders-in-Chief of India
British Army personnel of the American Revolutionary War
King's Own Royal Regiment officers
Lancashire Fusiliers officers
People from County Offaly